Horst Seemann (11 April 1937 – 6 January 2000) was a German film director and screenwriter. He has directed 19 films between 1962 and 1995. His 1973 film Ripe Cherries was entered into the 8th Moscow International Film Festival. His 1984 film Woman Doctors was entered into the 34th Berlin International Film Festival.

Selected filmography
 Wedding Night in the Rain (1967)
 Zeit zu leben (1969)
 Ripe Cherries (1973)
 Woman Doctors (1984)

References

External links

1937 births
2000 deaths
German film directors
People from Teplice District
20th-century German screenwriters
German male screenwriters